K. Lawrence (died May 8, 2020)  was an Indian politician and former Member of the Legislative Assembly. He was elected to the Tamil Nadu legislative assembly as an Anna Dravida Munnetra Kazhagam candidate from Padmanabhapuram constituency in 1991 elections.

References 

People from Kanyakumari district
All India Anna Dravida Munnetra Kazhagam politicians
2020 deaths
Year of birth missing
Tamil Nadu MLAs 1991–1996